Cristina Galbó Sánchez (born 17 January 1950) is a Spanish actress who achieved moderate fame in Europe during the late 1960s and early 1970s, making a name for herself in film mostly for European horror films.

In 1967 she appeared in Dove si spara di più, directed by Gianni Puccini and starring Peter Lee Lawrence, with whom she married.

Arguably her best-known role is as "Elizabeth Seccles", a boarding school girl having an affair with a married professor of Italian and gymnastics, in the 1972 Massimo Dallamano giallo, What Have You Done to Solange? A recent DVD release of her 1975 film The Killer Must Kill Again, the most notable work of Luigi Cozzi (a friend and associate of giallo film master Dario Argento) has presented her controversial work in that more obscure representative of the Italian horror genre.

Cozzi mentions on his DVD commentary for the film how Galbó was uncomfortable with the film's most disturbing scene, the killer's rape of her kidnapped and abused character. Galbó also has a significant role in another boarding school shocker, Narciso Ibáñez Serrador's 1969 Spanish film The House That Screamed.

Filmography 
 1966 La ciudad no es para mí 
 1969 Blood in the Bullring  - Paloma Domínguez.
 1969 Shoot Twice 
 1969 The House That Screamed 
 1972 Cosa avete fatto a Solange? (English title: What Have You Done to Solange?)
 1974 Let Sleeping Corpses Lie - Edna Simmonds.
 1975 L'assassino è costretto ad uccidere ancora (English title: The Killer Must Kill Again) - Laura.
 1975 Olivida los tambores (English:Forget the Drums) - Pili.

References

External links

1950 births
Living people
Spanish film actresses
Actresses from Madrid
20th-century Spanish actresses